East Naples is an unincorporated community in Collier County, Florida, United States. East Naples has been the county seat since 1962, when the Collier County Courthouse was moved from Everglades (see Old Collier County Courthouse).

East Naples is part of the Naples–Marco Island Metropolitan Statistical Area.

Notable people 

 Warner Wolf, sportscaster

References

Unincorporated communities in Collier County, Florida
Former census-designated places in Florida
Unincorporated communities in Florida
County seats in Florida